Seberang Musi is a district (kecamatan) of Kepahiang Regency, Bengkulu, Indonesia.

Subdistricts 
 Air Pesi 
 Air Selimang 
 Benuang Galing 
 Cirebon Baru 
 Kandang 
 Lubuk Sahung 
 Taba Padang 
 Talang Gelompok 
 Talang Babatan 
 Tebat Laut 
 Temdak

Districts of Kepahiang Regency